Illogan (pronounced il'luggan) is a village and civil parish in west Cornwall, UK, two miles (3 km) northwest of Redruth. The population of Illogan was 5,404 at the 2011 census. In the same year the population of the Camborne-Redruth urban area, which also includes Carn Brea, Illogan and several satellite villages, stood at 55,400 making it the largest conurbation in Cornwall. 
Originally a rural area supporting itself by farming and agriculture, Illogan shared in the general leap into prosperity brought about by the mining boom, which was experienced by the whole Camborne-Redruth area.

History

Antiquities
In 1931 the ruins of a Roman villa at Magor Farm were found by Nicholas Warren and excavated under the guidance of the Royal Institution of Cornwall. The villa was probably the residence of a wealthy Dumnonian who had adopted the Roman lifestyle.

Church

The Church of England parish church was dedicated to St Illogan (Ylloganus or Euluganus) and St Edmund; the earliest reliable reference, dated 1235, refers to the Ecclesia of Eglossalau. By 1844, the church had become too small to serve a vastly increasing mining population, so a new church was built to the designs of J. P. St Aubyn. at a cost of £2,875 and came into use on 4 November 1846.  The bell tower is all that remains of the old church; Trinity House refused to allow its removal as it provided a useful landmark for shipping.  The church reopened in 2012 after extensive repairs to the roof.

The churchyard includes fifty-two Commonwealth War Graves., and the grave of Thomas Merritt, whose carols are sung by Cornishmen worldwide and who was commissioned to write the 1902 Coronation March for Edward VII.  The Church, its tower, the Basset sarcophagus, a Cornish cross, and the gates at the north end of the churchyard are all Grade II Listed. The Cornish cross in the churchyard is probably in situ.

 The ecclesiastical parish extends beyond Carn Brea and includes long stretches of the North Cliffs – from Reskajeage Downs on the North Cliffs to Cambrose, with a population of 12,500 people.  It was split into three civil parishes - Illogan; Carn Brea, which includes the village of Pool; and Portreath.
 The civil parish has a population of 5,404 and stretches from Bridge and Harris Mill in the East; Tolvaddon and Bell Lake in the West; and from the A30 to Reskajeage.

Buildings

 Parts of Aviary Court date back 300 years and was the home of mining engineer James Tangye; this is now a hotel.
 The Bain Memorial, in memory of David Wise Bain who owned Portreath Harbour, built in 1901 as almshouses for decayed (invalid) miners.
 Mary's Well (1888) named after the wife of Gustavus Lambart Basset .
 The Plymouth limestone and granite faced Paynters Lane End Methodist Church, was built in 1890. The Methodist Sunday School was built in 1858; 30 years before the Chapel.

Amenities
 Illogan School provides education for 4-11 year olds.
 Tehidy Country Park, the largest area of woodland in West Cornwall, containing an 18-hole golf course. Is owned and managed by Cornwall Council.  Tehidy was the estate of the Basset family, one of the four most powerful families in Cornwall who had extensive lands and mineral rights.
 Maningham Community Woodland was opened in 2004.  It was part of an ornamental garden for the old Rectory now called Maningham – now a private house – built of Bath stone in 1783 for the Rev John Basset, brother of Lord De Dunstanville whose monument is seen on Carn Brea.

Notable residents
Julia Goldsworthy, Politician
Rory McGrath, comedian
 Sir Richard Trevithick Tangye, engineer and philanthropist.
Moondyne Joe, bushranger.

Sports
The town football club, Illogan RBL, has a reserve team that is very famous, as they beat Madron FC 55–0 in the Mining League, the worst-ever fair defeat.

Literature
 In the Poldark novels by Winston Graham, Demelza Carne was born in 'Illuggan'.

References

External links

Villages in Cornwall
Civil parishes in Cornwall